The Valerie Fraser Camanachd Cup also known as the Valerie Fraser Trophy or the Women's Camanachd Cup is the premier trophy in Women's shinty and is currently sponsored by Peter Gow. It is played on a knock-out basis by the teams in the National Division 1 League and is administered by the Women's Camanachd Association.
The current holders are Skye Camanachd.

History
The trophy was originally donated to the Camanachd Association in memory of Valerie Fraser.  It was originally a trophy for male teams and it was won by Glenurquhart in 1991. Some years later, after the competition fell into abeyance, it was donated to the Women's Camanachd Association and was first played for on 28 July 2002.

In 2009, the WCA held the semi-finals on one day at University of Stirling. Glengarry defeated Tir Conaill Harps 2–1 to win the 2009 Cup. There is also a national trophy for Division Two teams, the Marine Harvest Challenge Cup.

2013 saw an epic final at The Eilan, where Badenoch and Stathspey's Jane Nicol, in her final game before retirement, secured the victory over a heavily fancied Glasgow Mid-Argyll. GMA would however overcome Skye in 2014 and Badenoch in 2015 to secure League and Cup doubles.

The 2016 cup final was contested on 28 August at An Aird in Fort William between Skye Camanachd and Lochaber which meant a new name would be added to the list of winners as neither side had won the cup before. League Champions Skye were slight favourites but Lochaber won the day 4- 2, with all four of their goals coming from full-back turned forward Kirsty Delaney (6, 32, 67 and 76 mins). Lorna MacRae scored both the Skye goals (27, 74 mins). Player of the match went to Lochaber goalkeeper Aeleen Campbell for a fantastic display which prevented the Skye ladies from achieving the league and cup double.

Skye finally broke their Valerie Fraser hoodoo with a comprehensive 6–1 thumping of Lochaber at the same location, An Aird in 2017.

The sensational 2019 final between Skye and Badenoch was broadcast live on BBC Alba the Scottish Gaelic television channel.

Previous winners
2019 – Skye Camanachd 8 v 6 Badenoch, at The Dell, Kingussie
2018 – Badenoch & Strathspey 4 v 1 Skye Camanachd, at The Dell, Kingussie
2017 – Skye Camanachd 6 v 1 Lochaber, at An Aird, Fort William
2016 – Lochaber 4 v 2 Skye Camanachd, at An Aird, Fort William
2015 – Glasgow Mid Argyll 1 v 0 Badenoch & Strathspey, at The Bught Park, Inverness
2014 – Glasgow Mid Argyll 3 v 2 Skye Camanachd, at Strachurmore, Strachur
2013 – Badenoch & Strathspey 3 v 1 Glasgow Mid Argyll, at The Eilan, Newtownmore
2012 – Aberdour 4 v 3 Glengarry, at Strachurmore, Strachur
2011 – Glengarry 4 v 0 Aberdour, at The Eilan, Newtownmore 
2010 – Glengarry 5 v 0 Tir Conaill Harps, at Mossfield, Oban 
2009 – Glengarry 2 v 1 Tir Conaill Harps, at Stirling University
2008 – Tir Conaill Harps 2 v 1 Glengarry
2007 – Forth Camanachd (Runners up – Glasgow Mid Argyll)
2006 – Glasgow Mid Argyll (Runners up – Glengarry)
2005 – Glengarry (Runners up – Edinburgh)
2004 – Glengarry (Runners up – Kingussie)
2003 – Glasgow Mid Argyll (Runners up – Glengarry B)
2002 – Glengarry 7 v 0 Kingussie, at Jubilee Park, Ballahullish

Winners of Valerie Fraser Camanachd Cup for Women

Runners-up of Valerie Fraser Camanchd Cup for Women

Winners of the Player of the Match Award
2019 - Lorna MacRae (Skye Camanachd)
2018 – Kristy Deans (Badenoch & Strathspey)
2017 – Lorna MacRae (Skye Camanachd)
2016 – Aeleen Campbell (Lochaber)
2015 – Kristy Deans (Badenoch & Strathspey)
2014 – Sarah Corrigall (Skye Camanachd)
2013 – Rachel McCafferty (Glasgow Mid Argyll)
2012 – Katy Smith (Aberdour)
2011 – Laura Gallacher (Glengarry)
2010 – Elaine Wink (Glengarry)
2009 – Beth MacDonald (Glengarry)
2008 – Sarah Corrigall (Glengarry)
2007 – Katy Smith (Forth)
2006 – Kirsten Munro (Glasgow Mid Argyll)
2005 – Jane Nicol (Glengarry)
2004 – Sarah Corrigall (Glengarry)
2003 – Katie Drain (Glasgow Mid Argyll)
2002 – Cara Dallas (Kingussie)

Previous winners of men's competition
1995 Beauly 2 v 0 Strathglass
1994 ? bt Strathglass
1993 ?
1992 Kinlochshiel
1991 Glenurquhart bt Glengarry
1990 Glenurquhart bt Glengarry
1989 ? bt Strathglass
1988 Caberfeidh
1987 Caberfeidh

References

External links
History of the tournament
2015 Valerie Fraser Final on YouTube
2013 Valerie Fraser Final on YouTube
2011 Valerie Fraser Final on YouTube

Awards established in 1991
Shinty competitions
Scottish sports trophies and awards
1991 establishments in Scotland
1991 in Scottish women's sport